Kateřina Marešová (born ) was a Czech female artistic gymnast, representing her nation at international competitions.

She participated at the 2000 Summer Olympics, and the 2003 World Artistic Gymnastics Championships.

References

External links
http://assets.espn.go.com/oly/summer00/results/wgymnastics1.html
http://www.intlgymnast.com/index.php?option=com_content&view=category&layout=blog&id=2&Itemid=166&limitstart=175
http://www.gymmedia.com/artistic-gymnastics/Czech-National-Championships
https://www.youtube.com/watch?v=It8LuxedbuQ

1984 births
Living people
Czech female artistic gymnasts
Place of birth missing (living people)
Gymnasts at the 2000 Summer Olympics
Olympic gymnasts of the Czech Republic